The Pakistani national cricket team visited Zimbabwe in November 2002 and played a two-match Test series against the Zimbabwean national cricket team. Pakistan won the Test series 2–0. Pakistan were captained by Waqar Younis and Zimbabwe by Alistair Campbell.

Test series summary

1st Test

2nd Test

One Day Internationals (ODIs)

1st ODI

2nd ODI

3rd ODI

4th ODI

5th ODI

References

External links

2002 in Pakistani cricket
2002 in Zimbabwean cricket
Pakistani cricket tours of Zimbabwe
International cricket competitions in 2002–03
Zimbabwean cricket seasons from 2000–01